Langley is a habitational surname from any of the numerous places named with Old English lang (meaning ‘long’) + lēah (meaning ‘wood’ or ‘glade’)

List of people with this surname
A. DeWade Langley, American police officer
Ambrose Langley (1870–1937), English football manager
Anthony Langley (born 1954) British businessman
Arthur Langley, previously Arthur Longbottom (footballer) (born 1933), English football manager
Batty Langley (1696–1751), English garden designer
Bob Langley (born 1939), English TV presenter
Brendan Langley (born 1994), American football player
Brian Langley, American politician
Bruno Langley (born 1983), English actor
Chris Langley (born 1980), English rugby league player
Clint Langley (born 1970), English comic-book artist
Desmond Langley (1930–2008), English army officer
Donna Langley-Shamshiri (born 1968), British movie executive and Chairwoman of Universal Pictures
Dorothy Langley (1904–1969), American author
Edmund of Langley, 1st Duke of York (1341–1402), English prince
Elizabeth Langley (born 1933), Canadian performer, choreographer, teacher and dramaturge
Elmo Langley (1928–1996), American NASCAR driver
Elizabeth Langley, née Elizabeth Cass (1863–1954), English victim of controversial court proceedings in 1887 
Esme Langley (1919–1991), English writer
Eve Langley (1908 – c.1974), Australian novelist and poet
Francis Langley (1548–1602), English theatre producer
Frank Langley (1882–1946), Australian VFL football player
Gary Langley (born 1984), English rugby league player
Geoffrey of Langley (fl. 1270–1294), English knight
Gerard Langley, English musician with The Blue Aeroplanes
Gil Langley (1919–2001), Australian cricketer
Gill Langley (born 1952), British writer and animal-rights activist
Harold D. Langley (1925–2020), American historian
Harry Langley, English architect
Henry Langley (disambiguation), several people
Isaiah Langley (born 1996), American football player
J. Batty Langley (1834–1914), English politician
James Langley, (1916–1983), British soldier and intelligence officer
Jamie Langley (born 1983), English rugby league player
Jamie Langley (Miss Alabama) (born 1984), American broadcaster
Jane Langley (born 1959), English painter
Jane Pickens Langley (1907–1982), American singer
Jim Langley (1929–2007), English footballer
John Langley (disambiguation), several people
Katherine G. Langley (1888–1948), American congresswoman
Kevin Langley (born 1964), English footballer
Lee Langley, Scottish/Indian author
Lesley Langley (born 1944), English beauty queen
Matthew Langley, American photographer
Michael Langley, American Lt. Gen. 
Mick Langley (died 2018), British snooker player
Monica Langley, American journalist
Morgan Langley (producer) (born 1974), American TV producer
Morgan Langley (soccer) (born 1989), American soccer player
Neva Jane Langley (1933–2012), American beauty queen
Noel Langley (1911–1980), South African playwright
Orville Edwin Langley (1908–1973), American judge
R. F. Langley (Roger Francis Langley, 1938–2011), English poet
Richard Langley (born 1979), Jamaican footballer
Richard Langley (martyr) (died 1586), English martyr
Richard Langley (priest) (1563–1615), Head Master of Eton College from 1591 to 1611
Roger Langley (disambiguation), several people
Samuel Pierpont Langley (1834–1906), scientist and early experimenter in crewed flight
Scott Langley (born 1989), American golfer
Thomas Langley (disambiguation), several people
Tommy Langley (born 1958), English footballer
Walter Langley (1852–1922), English artist
Walter B. Langley (1921–1976), New York state senator

Fictional characters
Asuka Langley Soryu, a character from the anime series Neon Genesis Evangelion
Cal Langley, a character from Roswell
Paul Langley (Waterloo Road), a character from Waterloo Road
The foster name of Princess Arianna, a character from the book series Unicorns of Balinor

English-language surnames
English toponymic surnames